1908 in philosophy

Events 
Kurt Grelling and Leonard Nelson propose the Grelling–Nelson paradox.

Publications

Births 
 March 14 - Maurice Merleau-Ponty, French phenomenological philosopher (died 1961)
 June 25 - Willard Van Orman Quine, American analytical philosopher (died 2000)
 November 28 - Claude Lévi-Strauss, Belgian-born French anthropologist (died 2009)

Deaths

References 

Philosophy
20th-century philosophy
Philosophy by year